Goulet Bluff is a point on the western side of the Peron Peninsula in the Shark Bay World Heritage Site that acts as an important marker between the Denham Sound or northern portion of the Western Gulf Zone from the southern fishing zone of Freycinet Estuary.
A  beach is located to the north side of the bluff. Waves usually maintain a migrating spit at the southern end of the each forming a narrow lagoon.

References

Shark Bay